Marta May, born María Jesús Mayor Ávila (14 June 1939) is a Spanish actress.

In 1968 she was awarded by the Círculo de Escritores Cinematográficos for best actress in La piel quemada.

In 1975 Esteban Durán directed Algo de ti en el arcoiris at the Teatro Don Juan in Barcelona, and it starred Alejandro Ulloa, Marta May, and Eduardo Criado.

Filmography

Films
{{columnslist|
 La cruz de Iberia (1990) as Condesa
 The Ages of Lulu (1990) as Madre de Lulú
 Phoenix the Warrior (1988) as Prostitute
 Un, dos, tres... ensaïmades i res més (1985) as Vídua Leclero
 Pa d'àngel (1984)
 Puny clos (1982)
 Putapela (1991)
 El vicari d'Olot (1981) as Senyora Maria
 Cara quemada (1980)
 Companys, procés a Catalunya (1979) as Carme Ballester
 La ràbia (1978) as Professora de ciències
 El avispero (1976)
 La ciutat cremada (1976) as Desarrapada
 Metralleta 'Stein''' (1975) as Margarita
 Eyeball (1975) as Alma Burton
 Horror Story (1972) as Katia
 Pastel de sangre as Vampira
 La mujer celosa (1970)
 Las piernas de la serpiente (1970) as Blanca
 Metamorfosis (1970)
 Presagio (1970) as Carla
 Pulsus (1970)
 Cabezas cortadas (1970) as Soledad
 Twenty Paces to Death (1970) as
 La respuesta (1969) as Renata
 La piel quemada (1967) as Juana
 El primer cuartel (1966) as Asunción
 La mujer del desierto (1966)
 The Texican (1966) as Elena
 Seven Pistols for a Gringo (1966)
 Doomed Fort (1964) as Mary
 Twins from Texas (1964) as Betty
}}

TV series
 La comedia (1983) as Valentina in "Sólo para hombres"
 Un encargo original (1983) in "El arte de mirar"

References

External links
 

1939 births
Living people
20th-century Spanish actresses
Spanish film actresses
Spanish stage actresses